Li Wenhao (born 26 May 1983 in Tieling, Liaoning) is a male Chinese Olympic cyclist. He competed for Team China at the 2008 Summer Olympics.

Major performances
2006 Track National Championships - 3rd, 1 km time trial;
2007 Track Asian Championships - 1st, 1 km time trial;
2007 Track World Cup, Sydney - 2nd, 1 km time trial;
2007 Track World Cup, Beijing - 3rd, 1 km time trial;
2008 Track World Cup, Los Angeles - 3rd, 1 km time trial
2008 Track World Championships - 7th, team sprint;
2007-2008 - 1st world 1 km total points

Records
2008 World Championships - 1:02.503, 1 km time trial (NR)

External links
 Profile Beijing 2008 Team China
 (spelled as Hao Li Wen)

1983 births
Living people
Cyclists at the 2008 Summer Olympics
Olympic cyclists of China
People from Tieling
Sportspeople from Liaoning
21st-century Chinese people